Alice Russell may refer to:

Alice Russell (singer) (born 1975), British soul singer
Alice B. Russell (1889-1985), American actress